Ab Bid-e Dalun (also Romanized as Āb Bīd-e Dālūn; also known as Āb Bīd) is a village in Bakesh-e Yek Rural District, in the Central District of Mamasani County, Fars Province, Iran. At the 2006 census, its population was 81, in 18 families.

References 

Populated places in Mamasani County